The National Botanic Garden of Latvia is a botanical garden in Salaspils, Latvia. It is one of the largest botanical gardens in the Baltic states.

History
The present institution was founded in 1956, but traces its history back to 1836, when Сhristian Wilhelm Schoch founded a commercial plant nursery, which later moved to Salaspils. Before World War II, it was the largest plant nursery in the Baltic states. In 1944 it was turned into a state-owned experimental garden and in 1956 became the botanical garden of the Latvian Academy of Sciences. Since the re-establishment of Latvian independence in 1992, it has served as the National Botanic Garden of Latvia.

Description
The National Botanic Garden of Latvia have the following main tasks: "investigations in botany and ornamental gardening, plant collections, introduction of plants, researches in genetics and breeding and information and popularisation of the investigations' results." It is the largest botanical garden in the Baltic states, and covers an area of almost . It contains more than 14,000 plant taxa, which includes more than 5,000 trees and circa 1400 hothouse plants. Apart from its scientific purpose, the National Botanic Garden is also a popular park for leisure use.
927/5000

Collections 
National Botanic Garden of Latvia has some 18,000 species of live plants and 15,000 taxa of plants in cultivation, which are exhibited in different collections of which the following stand out:
 
 Rhododendron with 227 subspecies, hybrids and cultivar is
 Crataegus with 224 taxa,
 Cotoneaster with 120 taxa,
 Salix with 176 taxa,
 Populus with 138 taxa,
 Arboretum of 60 hectares, which exhibits 5000 taxa of trees and shrubs.
 Pinetum with 771 species and varieties of conifers,
 Rosarium about 100 wild species and about 1,020 cultivars of roses,
 Tulipa with about 900 taxa,

It also has within it an extension of 5 ha of preserved natural wild vegetation.

See also
 Kalsnava Arboretum

References

Botanical gardens in Latvia
Parks in Latvia